Cementoblastoma, or benign cementoblastoma, is a relatively rare benign neoplasm of the cementum of the teeth. It is derived from ectomesenchyme of odontogenic origin. Cementoblastomas represent less than 0.69–8% of all odontogenic tumors.

Signs and symptoms
Cementoblastoma usually occurs in people under the age of 25, particularly males. It usually involves the permanent mandibular molars or premolars. The involved tooth usually has a vital pulp. It is attached to the tooth root and may cause its resorption, may involve the pulp canal, grows slowly, tends to expand the overlying cortical plates, and, except for the enlargement produced, is usually asymptomatic. This involves the buccal and lingual aspects of the alveolar ridges. But may be associated with diffuse pain and tooth mobility, but the tooth is still vital.

Since a cementoblastoma is a benign neoplasm, it grossly forms a mass of cementum-like tissue as an irregular or round mass attached to the roots of a tooth, usually the permanent mandibular first molar.

Diagnosis
A cementoblastoma in a radiograph appears as a well-defined, markedly radiopaque mass, with a radiolucent peripheral line, which overlies and obliterates the tooth root. It is described as having a rounded or sunburst appearance. There is usually apparent external resorption of the root where the tumor and the root join. Severe hypercementosis and chronic focal sclerosing osteomyelitis are lesions to consider in the differential diagnosis of this lesion.

Treatment
Surgical enucleation  of the lesion is done, and depending upon the clinical circumstances, this  involve removal of the involved tooth. With incomplete removal, recurrence is common; some surgeons advocate curettage after extraction of teeth to decrease the overall rate of recurrence.

See also
 Cementum
 Cementogenesis
 Cementoblast

References

External links 

Odontogenic tumors